Lambertville Historic District is located around the intersection of Route 29 and Route 179 in Lambertville, Hunterdon County, New Jersey, United States. The district was added to the National Register of Historic Places on June 30, 1983.

History
A wooden bridge was constructed across the Delaware River in 1812 to connect Lambertville with New Hope, Pennsylvania. Bridge street was laid out to meet with the bridge. Many of Lambertville's oldest structures are located along Bridge street. A tavern on Bridge street called the Lambertville House was built by Captain John Lambert in 1812. The James W. Marshall House also on Bridge street was built in 1816. The Delaware and Raritan Canal was constructed in 1830. The Belvidere Delaware Railroad was built along the canal in 1851.

Gallery of contributing properties

References

External links
 

Houses on the National Register of Historic Places in New Jersey
Federal architecture in New Jersey
Geography of Hunterdon County, New Jersey
Historic districts on the National Register of Historic Places in New Jersey
National Register of Historic Places in Hunterdon County, New Jersey
Houses in Hunterdon County, New Jersey
New Jersey Register of Historic Places
Historic American Buildings Survey in New Jersey
Lambertville, New Jersey